The GMC Sprint is a coupe utility/pickup that was produced by GMC for the 1971–1977 model years. The Sprint was renamed Caballero for the 1978 model year, and produced through 1987. The rear-wheel-drive car-based pickups were sold by GMC Truck dealers primarily in the United States and Canada as the GMC version of the Chevrolet El Camino. Trim designations, emblems, and wheel trim differentiate the GMC from the Chevrolet. The vehicles were built on the General Motors A platform through 1981; for 1982, it was re-designated the G platform as the A platform switched to front-wheel drive.

Sprint

First generation (1971–1972)

In 1971 GMC began producing the Sprint, their version of the Chevrolet El Camino. This light-duty pickup truck was identical to the El Camino except for the name, and the chassis for both cars was based on the Chevrolet Chevelle station wagon/4-door sedan wheelbase. The Sprint's first year was also the first year for mandated lower-octane unleaded fuel which necessitated a reduction in engine compression; GM's A.I.R. system, a "smog pump", was added to control tailpipe emissions.  1972 was the last year for the third generation El Camino, resulting in a two-year generation for Sprint. For 1972, little changed but for lower power outputs. Engine offerings for 1971–72 included the 250 cubic-inch OHV inline Six, small block V8s of 307 and 350 cubic inches; and big block V8s of 402 and 454 cubic-inch displacements. Horsepower ratings of those engines for 1971 ranged from 145 for the six to 365 for the 454—all in gross figures. For 1972, horsepower measurements were switched to the "net" figures as installed in a vehicle with all accessories and emission controllers hooked up—this change brought the horsepower ratings for 1972 down to a range from 110 horsepower (82 kW) for the six to 270 for the 454 V8. The Sprint shared exterior and interior trims with the Chevelle Malibu and El Camino including cloth and vinyl or all-vinyl bench seats and deep twist carpeting. All-vinyl Strato bucket seats and center console were optional.

Both the El Camino and Sprint shared the same body styling as the Chevelle from the cowl to the front bumper.  The 1971 models featured the Chevelle's twin parking light lenses, dual "high intensity" headlights and horizontally-divided front grille.  A large "GMC" badge replaced the Chevy bowtie and for models with optional engines, engine badges (depicting cubic inch size), identical to those of the counterpart Chevrolet, were placed just below the divider bar on the left side of the grille.  Both years featured rear end styling taken from the Chevelle station wagon (and were shared with El Camino).

For 1972, the Sprint was given the updated Chevelle front end styling, retaining the "GMC" and optional engine badges in their 1971 locations.

The Sprint has the same design, features, and equipment as the El Camino, with some renamed. It was offered as "Standard" or "Custom". The inline six was only available on the "Standard".  Like the Chevelle and El Camino, the GMC Sprint could be ordered with a standard 3-speed Synchro-Mesh manual transmission, an optional four-speed Synchro-Mesh manual, or the Turbo Hydra-Matic three-speed automatic transmission.  Luxury options, such as air conditioning, cruise control, power windows, and power locks, were also available at extra cost.

Sprint SP
The SP package, only offered on the Sprint Custom, was GMC's own equivalent of the Chevrolet SS package. It included the same features as the Chevrolet. The Sprint SP was an option package, RPO YE7, rather than a distinct model. Engines were an L48 350 4 barrel, LS3 400 (402) big block, and the LS5 454 365 hp big block.

Second generation (1973–1977)

For 1973, all GM A-body vehicles were redesigned. It was the largest generation of the Sprint, but thanks to lighter construction, it weighed less than the previous generation. Engine offerings during this period included a 250 cubic-inch inline six, as well as a variety of V8s, including the 305, 350 and 400 cubic-inch versions of the Chevy small-block V8, plus the 454 Turbo-Jet big block through 1975. GMC carried over the "Standard" and "Custom" Sprint designations. The inline six was still only available on the "Standard". Catalytic converters were added to all engines beginning with the 1975 model. Other than annual grill revisions and a switch to quad-stacked, rectangular headlights in 1976, the Sprint remained relatively unchanged through 1977, when the "Sprint" name was replaced with "Caballero" for 1978.

Sprint SP
The Chevelle SS was dropped after 1973, but the El Camino was one of the few Chevrolet models to retain an SS package. Following suit, GMC continued to offer the Sprint with an SP package, though it was still only available on the Sprint Custom. It no longer included the two fat hood stripes, and the 454 Turbo-Jet big block V8 was discontinued after 1975.

Caballero

Nameplate
The word "Caballero" is from the Spanish language. Its most common definition today in the Americas is "gentleman", though its technical definition is "horseman" (caballo meaning horse) or "knight". These are, in turn, related to the English "cowboy" (though the more appropriate Spanish equivalent of "cowboy" would be vaquero, based on "vaca" for "cow").  The Caballero name was previously used as a top trim level on the hardtop Buick Century Station wagon.

GMC's use of a Spanish-derived name was perhaps a response to the El Camino's own borrowing from Spanish colonial history (via the assumed reference to El Camino Real, the "King's Road", lit. "Regal Road"). Until 1979, Ford offered a similar vehicle, the Ford Ranchero, also with a Spanish name ("Rancher"). GMC also offered special trim packages for the Caballero under other Spanish names: Diablo, Laredo, Amarillo. As for the car's old nameplate, GM would later revive the Sprint name for a rebadged Suzuki Cultus sold under the Chevrolet banner.

Overview
The Caballero and the fifth generation El Camino shared their mechanical parts with the Chevrolet Malibu series, but rode on a 9-inch longer wheelbase. Other than different nameplates and minor trim variations, it is difficult to distinguish a Caballero from an El Camino at more than 10 paces distance. It was largely for this reason that the Caballero did not sell in the higher volumes that the El Camino did over the years (many never even knew a GMC version existed), though that rarity now counts as a plus to many Caballero fans and collectors.
Exterior appearance remained largely the same over the truck's nine-year lifespan, with the biggest changes through the years coming mostly in the form of grille design. From 1978 through 1981, this consisted of either "eggcrate" style (1978), horizontal bars (1979 and 1981) or vertical bars (1980). Then for 1982, the front end was changed to a full-width grille design housing four headlights and a four-row crosshatch pattern; this persisted through the vehicle's demise in 1987.

Caballero interiors featured a bench seat in standard models, though an upgrade to bucket seats with a center console and floor-mounted shifter was available. Most models with automatic transmission carried the shifter on the steering column. Cloth or vinyl upholstery choices were offered in a variety of colors. The instrument panel originally featured a "strip" style of speedometer, with the needle making a long sweep across a horizontal line of numbers to indicate speed. This was changed for 1981 to a more conventional round dial format, with some further minor tweaks for 1986. The 1987 model year was the end of the line for GM's North American coupe utilities, which included 420 leftover El Caminos and 325 Cabelleros that were reported first sold in 1988.

Laredo and Amarillo

Offered from 1978 until 1980 only, the Laredo was a Caballero equivalent to the El Camino's luxurious Conquista package. Equipment included two-tone paint in various color combinations and a "Laredo" decal on the tailgate.

For 1981, the Laredo became known as the Amarillo, and this name would continue through 1987.  With the exception of the different name decal on the tailgate, the package was substantially the same. GMC changed this package's name at about the same time as Jeep began using the "Laredo" name (as a trim level with the 1980 CJ-7) for a variety of special models in their own line - later evolving into a trim package with its XJ Cherokee and the midlevel (later base) trim level with the Grand Cherokee.

Diablo

The sporty Diablo package began in 1978 as an equivalent to the El Camino's Black Knight (1978)/Royal Knight (post-1978) package (which was, in turn, an upgrade from the long-running Super Sport package). Both the Royal Knight and the Diablo carried a hood graphic not unlike that featured on the Pontiac Trans Am; the Diablo's was in a symmetrical flame pattern that resembled a demon. Besides the hood accents, Diablo also came with lower-body accent paint, body-color mirrors, black-trimmed window frames, a front air dam, color-matched "Rally" steel wheels with trim rings, and a large "Diablo" decal on the tailgate.

When Chevrolet dropped the Royal Knight option from the El Camino option list for 1982, GMC's Diablo remained but was now analogous to the "normal" Super Sport model. This meant that the flame decal was gone, but little else changed. However, when the El Camino Super Sport gained a new dealer optioned aerodynamic front end from Choo Choo Customs for 1984, the Diablo stuck with the same front end it had carried since the final factory front clip revision (for the Malibus, El Caminos and Caballeros) from 1982. The Diablo was offered through the end of the Caballero line in 1987.

Available Engines: 
•200 CID 2bbl V6 (1978-1979)
•229 CID 2bbl V6 (1980-1981)
•231 CID 2bbl Buick V6 (1978-1981)- for California cars only
•267 CID 2bbl V8 (1979-1981)
•305 CID 2bbl V8 (1978 only)
•305 CID 4bbl V8 (1979-1981)
•350 CID 4bbl V8 (1978-1979)

Modern revival

Holden, GM's Australian division, has offered coupe-pickup models similar to the Caballero for years under the Ute name. Like the Caballero and El Camino, Holden's Ute is based on a car platform - in this case the long-running Commodore series. Rebadged Holden Utes were offered in South Africa as Chevrolet El Camino, and later the Lumina Ute.

For the 2008 model year, GM introduced an American version of the Commodore sedan called the Pontiac G8. Sometime after the announcement of the G8, GM announced that they would also be shipping over a revised version of the Ute. Since Pontiac shares most of its dealerships with GMC franchises, there was wide speculation that the Ute would be rebadged as a GMC (though not necessarily a Caballero or Sprint). However, GM later announced that the new pickup would also be Pontiac-branded, as the G8 ST. In January 2009, GM announced to dealers the G8 ST was cancelled due to budget cuts and restructuring.

And still, there was a chance that a coupe - pickup (or rather, a "sedan – pickup") could return to GMC. General Motors executive Robert Lutz announced in January 2008 that the division will display a GMC-badged version of the Holden Crewman, a four-door version of the standard Holden Ute pickup, at the New York Auto Show in March. Ultimately, the intended show vehicle eventuated as something quite different, in the GMC Denali XT Hybrid Concept, designed by GM Holden upon the Zeta platform, but bearing no resemblance to existing Holden product ... it debuted at the 2008 Chicago Auto Show, but plans for production based upon this unibody concept were subsequently cancelled circa September 2009.

Pontiac concept
In 1974, GMC's sister division, Pontiac, reportedly took an El Camino body, grafted the urethane-nose front end from its Grand Am series, added the Grand Am's instrument panel, Strato bucket seats with recliners and adjustable lumbar support, along with Pontiac's Rally II wheels as a styling exercise for a possible Pontiac version of the El Camino/Sprint. The concept however never reached production.  Another show car version was also created in the late 1970s but never left the concept stage.

Further reading
Ackerson, Robert C. Chevrolet High Performance. Krause Publications, 1994. 
Gunnell, John A., ed. Standard Catalog of American Light-Duty Trucks [Second Edition]. Krause Publications, 1993.

See also

Coupe utility (style of pickup truck)
Chevrolet El Camino
Dodge Rampage
Ford Ranchero
Holden Ute

References

Sprint Caballero
Coupé utilities
1970s cars
1980s cars
Motor vehicles manufactured in the United States